Pierre-Claude Gautherot (1769–1825), usually referred to as either Claude Gautherot or Pierre Gautherot, was a French artist.

He was born and died in Paris. He was a pupil of Jacques-Louis David, whose friendship involved him in the troubles of the Revolution. Gautherot opened a school of design where the most noted artists studied under his direction. His principal work, Napoleon haranguing his troops on the Bridge of the Lech at Augsburg, is at Versailles.

References

 

1769 births
1825 deaths
18th-century French painters
French male painters
19th-century French painters
Painters from Paris
Pupils of Jacques-Louis David
19th-century male artists
18th-century French male artists